Samuel McClellan (January 4, 1730 – October 17, 1807) was an American brigadier general in the American Revolutionary War. He was born in Worcester, Massachusetts. 

Samuel McClellan served as Ensign and Lieutenant in the French and Indian War, and was wounded in battle. Upon his return from the provincial campaign, he purchased a farm in Woodstock and settled there. He later engaged in mercantile business and established an extensive trade, importing goods and supplying neighboring merchants.

When the American Revolution put a stop to his trade, he trained and equipped the county militia. In 1773, a troop of horse was raised in Woodstock, Killingly, and Pomfret, Connecticut, of which he became commander.

In 1775, Major Samuel McClellan led 184 men at the Battles of Lexington and Concord. He played a prominent role in the Battle of Bunker Hill, and after achieving the rank of lieutenant colonel in 1776, colonel in 1777, and brigadier general of the 5th Brigade in 1779, his regiment of the Connecticut Militia was stationed near New Jersey. McClellan was solicited by General George Washington to join the Continental Army and was offered a commission, but his domestic and business affairs compelled him to refuse.

After the Battle of Groton Heights, and the invasion and burning of New London, Connecticut, McClellan was appointed to oversee troops stationed at those points and continued the command until the close of the war, acting as commissary in the purchase and forwarding of provisions for the army when not otherwise in active service.

Shortly after the war, he returned to Woodstock and was elected to the State Assembly. He was known to many, including his grandson, George McClellan, and great-grandson George B. McClellan (a Major General during the American Civil War), as "General Sam." Samuel's sons James and John founded the Woodstock Academy in 1801.

He married Jemina Chandler (born 1734) on November 16, 1757 in Killingly, Connecticut. After Chandler died in 1764, Samuel married Rachel Abbe (a descendant of Plymouth, Massachusetts Governor William Bradford) on March 5, 1766. He is buried in Woodstock, Connecticut.

Notes

References
Barbour, Lucius, and Newton Case Brainard, Comps., Connecticut Vital Records, Woodstock, Births-Marriages-Deaths, 1686-1854, Barbour Collection (NEHGS Photo Duplication, 1997; Hartford: Barbour & Brainard Co., 1914)
Heitman, Francis Bernard. Historical Register of Officers of the Continental Army During the War of the Revolution. Washington D.C.: The Rare Book Shop Publishing Co., Inc, 1914.
Sears, Stephen W. George B. McClellan: The Young Napoleon. New York, N.Y.: Da Capo Press, 1999.

External links
Service record from Francis B. Heitman's Historical Register of Officers of the Continental Army

1730 births
1807 deaths
People from Worcester, Massachusetts
People from Woodstock, Connecticut
American people of Scotch-Irish descent
People of Connecticut in the French and Indian War
People of Connecticut in the American Revolution
Military personnel from Connecticut
McClellan family